Gilson Adriano de Oliveira (born April 13, 1981 in Monte Azul Paulista), known as Gilsinho, is a Brazilian footballer who plays as midfielder.

Career statistics

References

External links

1981 births
Living people
Brazilian footballers
Association football midfielders
Agremiação Sportiva Arapiraquense players